Allan Slutsky, also known by his pen name, Dr. Licks, (born May 5, 1952 in Philadelphia, Pennsylvania) is an American arranger, guitarist, music producer, and historian.  He won a Grammy Award in 2002 for Best Compilation Soundtrack Album for a Motion Picture, Television or Other Visual Media.

Biography 
Slutsky studied music at Temple University. He went on to pursue guitar studies at the Berklee College of Music in Boston and graduated in 1978.

Slutsky went to Philadelphia and began transcribing music under the name "Dr. Licks."

Slutsky wrote the book Standing in the Shadows of Motown profiling the life of The Funk Brothers bass guitarist James Jamerson in 1987. The book went on to win the Rolling Stone/BMI Ralph J. Gleason Music Book Award in 1989.

Slutsky produced the documentary Standing in the Shadows of Motown, released in 2002. The film expanded the scope to cover The Funk Brothers group of musicians as a whole. The film won two Grammy Awards in 2003.

Books 
(1982) Doctor Licks: Rock's Hottest Guitar Solos Transcribed Note for Note
(1987) The Art of Playing Rhythm & Blues Volume One: The 50s and 60s
(1989) Standing in the Shadows of Motown: The Life and Music of Legendary Bassist James Jamerson
(1997) The Funkmasters-the Great James Brown Rhythm Sections 1960-1973
(2002) Beyond Basics: Funk Guitar Rhythm Chops
(2016) Bobby Rydell: Teen Idol on the Rocks: A Tale of Second Chances

References 

 

1950 births
Living people
20th-century American Jews
American music arrangers
American music historians
American male non-fiction writers
Berklee College of Music alumni
Grammy Award winners
Temple University alumni
Guitarists from Philadelphia
American male guitarists
20th-century American guitarists
Historians from Pennsylvania
20th-century American male musicians
21st-century American Jews